Genasauria is a clade of extinct beaked, primarily herbivorous dinosaurs. Paleontologist Paul Sereno first named Genasauria in 1986. The name Genasauria is derived from the Latin word gena meaning ‘cheek’ and the Greek word saúra (σαύρα) meaning ‘lizard.’ It is hypothesized that Genasauria had diverged from Lesothosaurus by the Early Jurassic. Cranial features that characterize Genasauria include a medial offset of the maxillary dentition, a sprout-shaped mandibular symphysis, moderately sized coronoid process, and an edentulous (without teeth) anterior portion of the premaxilla. A distinguishing postcranial feature of Genasauria is a pubic peduncle of the ilium that is less robust than the ischial peduncle. 
Genasauria is commonly divided into Neornithischia and Thyreophora. Neornithischia is characterized by asymmetrical distributions of enamel covering the crowns of the cheek teeth, an open acetabulum, and a laterally protruding ischial peduncle of the ilium. Neornithischia includes ornithopods, pachycephalosaurs, and ceratopsians. Thyreophora is characterized by body armor and includes stegosaurs, ankylosaurs, Scelidosaurus, and Scutellosaurus.

Definition
Paul Sereno's original, informal definition for the clade Genasauria was "Ankylosaurus, Triceratops, their most recent common ancestor and all descendants." In 2021, Genasauria was given a formal definition under the PhyloCode: "The smallest clade containing Ankylosaurus magniventris, Iguanodon bernissartensis, Stegosaurus stenops, and Triceratops horridus."

Distinguishing characteristics

Cranial characteristics
Genasauria contains a medial offset of the maxillary dentition (buccal emargination), which is commonly referred to as the ‘ornithischian cheek.' Other characteristics of the ornithischian cheek include “a deep-set position of the tooth rows, away from the sides of the face, a spout-shaped front to the mandibles, and reduction in the size of the opening on the outside of the lower jaw (the external mandibular foramen)." The ornithischian cheek is largely inferred to be evidence for the possession of muscular cheeks that were used for complex chewing behavior and is a fundamentally Genasaurian characteristic. Galton (1973) also suggests that the ornithischian cheek was found between the maxillary and dentary ridges to prevent the loss of food through the jaws. It may have consisted of connective tissue and skin, rather than muscle fibers, which meant that the tongue was used to move food that had accumulated between the teeth and the cheek, back to the tongue side of the cheek so that it could be further broken down by the teeth. The ornithischian cheek is absent or only weakly developed in Lesothosaurus, which supports its placement as a sister group to Genasauria.
In Genasauria, the mandibular symphysis is shaped like a spout and forms at an acute angle. The mandibular symphysis is the point of fusion between the two lateral dentary bones. The mandible of Genasauria is also characterized by the possession of a coronoid process that is longer than 50 percent of the depth of the midlength of the dentary. The coronoid process is a thin anterior projection of bone from the dentary, which serves as a site for the attachment of muscles that aid in chewing behavior.

Post-cranial characteristics
Post-cranial characteristics include reduced relative size of the pubic peduncle of the ilium and a fourth trochanter that is shifted distally on the shaft of the femur. The pubic peduncle of the ilium is an anterior extension of the ilium, which joins with the pubis. In Genasauria, the relative size of the public peduncle, compared to the size of the ilium, is reduced. The fourth trochanter is a process (extension) of the femur that serves as an attachment point for tail muscles, mainly for attachment of the Musculus caudofemoralis longus.

Feeding behavior
The members of Genasauria were primarily herbivores. Genasaurians most often had their head at the level of one meter, which suggests they were feeding primarily on “ground-level plants such as ferns, cycads, and other herbaceous gymnosperms."

Major divisions

Thyreophora
Thyreophora are defined as representing all taxa more closely related to Ankylosaurus than to Triceratops and are characterized by extensive dorsal body armor scutes. The group spanned about 100 million years, beginning in the early Jurassic through the late Cretaceous. During their time on earth, they gave rise to over 50 different species. They contain the groups Ankylosauria and Stegosauria, as well as, a number of basal forms such as Scelidosaurus, Emausaurus, and Scutellosaurus. Fossils of Thyreophora have been primarily found in the northern hemisphere. Thyreophora can be distinguished from Neornithischia based on: transversely broad process of the jugal and parallel rows of keeled scutes on the dorsal surface of the body.

Neornithischia
Neornithischia is a clade containing Ornithopoda and Marginocephalia, which is a node-based clade that contains Ceratopsia and Pachycephalosauria.  Neornithischia was previously labeled as Cerapoda. However, this name has been more recently given a less inclusive definition. Neorniththischia evolved during the Jurassic period and persisted until the late Cretaceous period. Their fossils have only been found in the northern hemisphere. Neornithischia can be distinguished from the Thyreophora by the following derived characteristics: significant diastem between premaxillary and maxillary teeth, five or fewer maxillary teeth, and finger-like anterior trochancter.

Classification

Taxonomy
This version of taxonomic classification is from The Dinosauria.
 Genasauria
 Thyreophora
 Scutellosaurus
 Ankylosauria
 Stegosauria
 Neornithischia
 Ornithopoda
 Marginocephalia
 Ceratopsia
 Pachycephalosauria

Phylogeny
There is debate as to the placement of Lesothosaurus as a sister group to Genasauria as or as a basal member of Genasauria. Sereno (1986) argues that Lesothosaurus does not contain the defining Genasaurian synapomorphies of a medial offset of the maxillary dentition, a sprout-shaped mandibular symphysis, moderately sized coronoid process, and an edentulous (without teeth) anterior portion of the premaxilla, and a pubic peduncle of the ilium that is less robust than the ischial peduncle. Butler (2011) argues that the synapomorphies that should exclude Lesothosaurus from Genasauria have been described in Lesothosaurus specimens. Butler writes “The position of Lesothosaurus within Neornithischia is supported by three unequivocal characters: reduction of the forelimb to less than 40% of the hind-limb length, presence of a dorsal groove on the ischium, and a strongly reduced, splint-like metatarsal one.” The following two cladograms illustrate the two opinions.

The following is a cladogram based on the paper by Sereno (1986) that originally defined Genasauria.

The following is a more recent cladogram based on an analysis by Butler et al. (2011).

References

External links
 Genasauria Phylogeny by Thomas R. Holtz, Jr.
  An obsolete order that embraced at least two of its groups.

Ornithischians
Taxa named by Paul Sereno